Jack Jones (born July 5, 1987) is an American soccer player.

Career
Jones spent time in Colorado Amateur Soccer League with FC Denver and the Premier Arena Soccer League with Golden Strikers, before attending an open tryout for Colorado Springs Switchbacks ahead of their 2017 season. Jones signed with USL club on March 3, 2017.

References

External links
Switchbacks bio

1987 births
Living people
American soccer players
Colorado Springs Switchbacks FC players
Association football defenders
Soccer players from Colorado
USL Championship players